Vassian Patrikeyev, also known as Vassian Kosoy (Вассиан Патрикеев, Вассиан Косой in Russian; real name – knyaz Василий Иванович Патрикеев, or Vasili Ivanovich Patrikeyev) (c. 1470 – between 1531 and 1545) was a Russian ecclesiastic and political figure and writer and an early member of the House of Golitsyn that traced its male-line descent to Duke Patrikas of Korela and to Gediminas, Grand Duke of Lithuania.

Political action
He was known to have been one of the leaders of the boyar party, which supported tsarevich Dmitry Ivanovich (grandson of Ivan III) in a struggle against Sophia Paleologue's son Vasili for succession to the throne.

In ecclesiastic matters, the boyar party was generally closer to heretical and freedom-loving circles.

In 1499, Ivan III found out about the conspiracy against Vasili and ordered arrests (the tsar first favored Dmitry Ivanovich).  Vassian Patrikeyev was forced to take monastic vows and sent to Kirillo-Belozersky Monastery.

Ecclesiastic career
At the monastery, Patrikeyev became a student of Nil Sorsky and absorbed his philosophy. It appears that in 1503 Patrikeyev and Sorsky came to Moscow to attend a church council (sobor). During this ecclesiastic meeting, the two demanded leniency for the heretics and opposed Joseph Volotsky's views on this issue, subsequently inflaming a dispute between the two parties in the form of personal letters.

During the reign of Vasili III, Patrikeyev reached an important status. Due to his rising influence, many heretics escaped severe punishment. At some point, the tsar even forbade Volotsky to defame Patrikeyev. It appears that Varlaam, who had been close to Nil Sorsky and his followers, was elected Metropolitan bishop with some assistance from Vassian Patrikeyev.

In about 1517, Patrikeyev began his work on revision of the so-called Кормчая книга (Kormchaya kniga, or Book of guidelines; see Canon law), a code of ecclesiastic decrees and laws by the Byzantine emperors. In 1518, Maximus the Greek came from Mount Athos to take part in his work, gathering oppositionary people around him, including Vassian Patrikeyev.

In 1523, a Josephinian hegumen from Volokolamsk named Daniel was elected metropolitan. Soon after this, the church commenced prosecution of the opposition.

A few years later, Patrikeyev's influence began to weaken due to, among other things, his open disapproval of Vasili's divorce. In 1531, Vassian was summoned to appear before the church council as a defendant. Metropolitan Daniel accused Patrikeyev of unauthorized revision of the Kormchaya kniga; insertion of Hellenistic ideas; arbitrary removal of passages which had asserted the right of the monasteries to own patrimonies; revilement of miracle workers, e.g. Saint Makarius Kalyazinsky and Metropolitan Jonah; "heretic lines" in his translation of Simeon Metaphrastes' Life of St. Mary. The church council found Patrikeyev guilty and sent him to a hostile Joseph-Volokolamsk Monastery, where he would die a decade later.

Patrikeyev's date of death is uncertain. He died no later than 1545 and a violent death, if one is to believe Ivan the Terrible's closest associate Andrei Kurbsky.

People of the Grand Duchy of Moscow
Russian religious leaders
Gediminids
1470s births
16th-century deaths